Mobius is an album by pianist Cedar Walton recorded in 1975 and released on the RCA label in 1975.

Reception
Allmusic awarded the album 2½ stars.

Track listing 
All compositions by Cedar Walton except as indicated
 "Blue Trane" (John Coltrane) – 10:04   
 "Soho" – 10:32   
 "Off Minor" (Thelonious Monk) – 7:54   
 "The Maestro" – 6:16   
 "Road Island Red" – 5:41

Personnel 
Cedar Walton – keyboards, arranger
Roy Burrowes – trumpet
Wayne Andre – trombone
Charles Davis, Frank Foster – saxophones
Ryo Kawasaki – electric guitar
Gordon Edwards – bass
Steve Gadd – drums
Omar Clay, Ray Mantilla – percussion
Adrienne Albert, Lani Groves – vocals

References 

Cedar Walton albums
1975 albums
RCA Records albums